The 1993 Air Force Falcons football team represented the United States Air Force Academy in the 1993 NCAA Division I-A football season. The team was led by 10th-year head coach Fisher DeBerry and played its home games at Falcon Stadium. It finished the season with a 4–8 record overall and a 1–7 record in Western Athletic Conference games.

Schedule

Roster
TE Joe Lombardi, Sr.

References

Air Force
Air Force Falcons football seasons
Air Force Falcons football